The Monarch Award: Illinois' K-3 Readers' Choice Award was established in 2003 by the Illinois School Library Media Association (ISLMA) to help Kindergarten through 3rd grade readers become familiar with books, illustrators and authors; encourage children to read critically; and to develop a statewide awareness of outstanding literature for children.

The award name and image was chosen as a symbol of growth, change and freedom and to help familiarize students with the state's insect.

Award Process 
The award is given annually (beginning in 2005) to a single author and/or illustrator by a collective vote of Kindergarten through 3rd grade students in Illinois. The award is administered by a steering committee that seeks nominations from public librarians, school library media specialist, teachers, and students. A volunteer reading committee then forms a master list of 20 of the nominated titles which include a range of interests and reading levels as well as 3 of each of the following types of children's books: 
Picture books
Easy readers
Chapter books
Students vote in February of each year for their favorite from the master list and the results are announced the following month.

Criteria for nomination 
Nominator must have read the book
Book copyrighted within the past 5 years
Be in print at the time of selection
Author and/or illustrator must be living at the time of selection of mater list
Book must be of interest and appeal to children in grades kindergarten through 3rd grade
Must have literary merit
May be fiction or nonfiction
No title or series may be on two consecutive master lists
If a title in a series has been awarded, other books in that series are ineligible for 5 years
Book must not be a textbook, anthology, translation, toy, puzzle, pop-up or formula fiction

Recipients 

Yellow background distinguishes winners from those runners-up that are listed.

References

External links 
Chicago Public Library Kid's Catalog
MacMillan Monarch Award Winners

American children's literary awards
Illinois culture
Illinois education-related lists
Awards established in 2003